A list of American films released in 1907.

See also
 1907 in the United States

External links

1907 films at the Internet Movie Database

1907
Films
American
1900s in American cinema